Fernando Sánchez may refer to:

 Fernando Sánchez de Castro (1241–1275), Aragonese infante and crusader
 Fernando Sánchez de Tovar (died 1384), Castillian soldier and admiral
 Fernando Sánchez Polack (1920–1982), Spanish actor
 Fernando Sánchez (designer) (1935–2006), Belgian fashion designer
 Fernando Sánchez Dragó (born 1936), Spanish writer and television host
 Fernando Sánchez (footballer) (born 1971), Spanish football manager and former footballer
 Fernando Sánchez Campos (born 1974), Costa Rican politician